Windlesham is a village in the Surrey Heath borough of Surrey, England, approximately  south west of central London. Its name derives from the Windle Brook, which runs south of the village into Chobham, and the common suffix 'ham', the Old English word for 'homestead'. The civil parish of Windlesham has a population of 17,000 and includes the neighbouring villages of Bagshot and Lightwater.

Access to the motorway is via junction 3 and the nearest railway station is at Bagshot.

History

The neighbourhood has yielded bronze implements, now in the Archaeological Society's Museum, Guildford, and a certain number of neolithic flints.

Windlesham was once a small community within Windsor Great Park, built as a remote farming settlement around undulating heath, similar to Sunninghill.  At Ribs Down in the north in private Updown Court and adjoining gardens land reaches 99 metres above sea level with a minimum descent (notch/col) of 31 metres, ranking 35th of 36 Surrey hills listed in the national hill-climbing database and the tallest private hill in Surrey.

This corner of the county appears, from absence of notice in the Domesday Book of 1086, to have been very sparsely inhabited.  Of Windlesham, Malden wrote:

Windlesham Manor appears among the manors granted to Westminster by Edward the Confessor in his foundation charter. It was apparently transferred to the small local Broomhall Convent at an unknown date.

Newark Priory had a grant of land in Windlesham in 1256, and had the advowson (right to appoint the vicar) of the church. 
Joan Rawlyns, Prioress of Broomhall, made a voluntary surrender of the property of her house in 1522 before the 1538 Dissolution of the Monasteries. In the next year Windlesham was granted to St. John's College, Cambridge, who still held it in 1911

In 1911 the village was, due to Surrey Heath, described as almost entirely modern, in much the same way as Wentworth, Surrey's landscape was tamed approximately at the turn of the 20th century, being naturally heather, gorse and fern and ideal for grass and laid out evergreen trees.

Economy
The Lilly Research Centre, built in 1967, is located in the north of the village. The BOC Group was based in the village, but was bought by Linde plc (Linde AG of Germany) in September 2006.

Local schools 
There are four schools in the Windlesham area, two of which are in the village itself: Windlesham Village Infants School. Woodcote House School is also in the area.

Recreation and social events 
Windlesham Field of Remembrance is owned, funded and run by the village community via a board of volunteer trustees.  The land was purchased from Admiral Cochrane in 1950 as a permanent memorial to the men and women of the village who lost their lives in the two World Wars, and is the site for the village's Remembrance Day ceremony.  It consists of both open space and mature woodland and includes a play area. Many village events take place on the field, including the annual Village Fete. . The field is also used by the village's football and cricket clubs. Other groups in the village include Windle Valley Runners and Windlesham Drama Group 

An annual pram race, in which teams race around the village stopping at every pub, usually happens every Boxing Day and raises money for local charities . In April 2017, the village was set to become a hedgehog friendly village, reported to be one of a handful of such villages in the United Kingdom.

Localities

Valley End

Valley End has two churches, St Saviour which was built in 1867 by the English architect George Frederick Bodley and Emmanuel Baptist Church. St Saviour's is built in red and brown brick with stone dressed windows. The interior is a simple mixture of brick and stone.  There is a Holy Communion service every Sunday at 9am.

Valley End School was founded in 1859 by the Hon. Julia Bathurst of Hyams Hall, Windlesham.

The Valley End Cricket Club was founded in 1895.

Bagshot
See Bagshot for this developed part of the civil parish.  There is the greatest concentration of shops and businesses in Bagshot compared to the other parts of the parish.

Lightwater
See Lightwater for this developed part of the civil parish

The Arboretum and the mansion of Updown Court 
Windlesham Arboretum is connected by footpath to the edge of the village centre but on the opposite side of the M3 motorway. In July 2007, the most expensive house in the world, Updown Court, in Windlesham was valued at £75m ($138m (USD)). This 103-room mansion has  of gardens and landscaped woodlands.

Demography and housing

The average level of accommodation in the region composed of detached houses was 28%, the average that was apartments was 22.6%.

The proportion of households in the civil parish who owned their home outright compares to the regional average of 35.1%.  The proportion who owned their home with a loan compares to the regional average of 32.5%.  The remaining % is made up of rented dwellings (plus a negligible % of households living rent-free).

Notable residents

 Mukhtar Ablyazov, Kazakhstani exile, government minister and bank chairman, alleged perpetrator of "one of largest frauds to appear before a court in the UK". Had UK asylum status removed and fled to France 
Dr Brian May, composer, guitarist and astrophysicist, key to the rock band Queen, and his wife, actress Anita Dobson
Brian Blessed, actor, adventurer and broadcaster; current resident.
Glenn Hoddle, England football manager
Sir Nick Faldo,  golfer
Sarah, Duchess of York. The Queen purchased Birch Hall on Church Road in 1997 as a future home for the Duchess and her daughters following the end of her marriage, but they never took up residence. 
The Queen lived in Windlesham Moor at one time before her coronation, before moving to Clarence House. After she became Queen she moved to Buckingham Palace.
Andrew Ridgeley, musician of Wham! was born in the nursing home that was along Hatton Hill, Windlesham. 
Edward Baigent was an early immigrant to Nelson, New Zealand and he was later elected to its Parliament.
Agatha Christie, queen of crime writers, at Ribsden
George Job Elvey, organist, died at The Towers
Sir Joseph Hooker F.R.S., scientist, at The Camp
 Sheikh Mohammed bin Rashid Al Maktoum, ruler of Dubai, has a property at Windlesham.
 Lin Blakley, actress best known for playing Pam Cocker in EastEnders.

References

External links

 Windelsham Field of Remembrance

 Population figures (PDF)
 St John the Baptist Church, Windlesham
 Updown Court
 Pram Race
 Windlesham Cricket Club
 Windle Valley Runners

Villages in Surrey
Surrey Heath
Civil parishes in Surrey